Maris Vijay is a film composer and singer from Tamil Nadu, India. He works for Tamil and Hindi cinema.

Film career
Maris Vijay started his film career in 2013 when he began Miracle Waves Studio, a recording and mixing studio. He was approached by film director "Paarthi" to compose the score and soundtrack for his Tamil film, Vingyani. Maris debuted as a film composer from this film in 2014.

In 2018, Maris sung a song in Villavan film.

Additionally, Maris Vijay has worked on non-film projects that were influenced by musical composers like A. R. Rahman. He wrote songs for numerous schools' anthems.

Shailey Bidwaikar along with Maris Vijay released her first Tamil song.

Maris received Nation's Icon Award in 2022.

Filmography
Vingyani (2014) (Tamil)
Villavan: The Vigilante (2018) (Malaysia), as actor and composer
Dans La Maison Du Capitaine (2018) (French)
Le Passage Secret (French & English)
Pidman (2018) (Tamil)
Sathiyam (2020)
Drop of Water (2021)
Break the silence (2021)
Sab Jhoote Hai, (Producer, Composer)

Independent Albums
Tere Bina Dil  Hindi Commercial Album (2002)
Abdul Kalam Anthem is an album of original compositions released for Addul Kalam (2015) in Sun Music & M-Muzik Official
14 for teen (2008)
The last moment (2021)
Pogadhe Nee Pogadhe (2021)

EPs and Singles
Jai Ho Kalam (feat. Savaniee Ravindrra)
Sab Jhoote Hai (feat. Hrishikesh Ranade)
Sab Jhoote Hai (feat. Savaniee Ravindrra)
Allithantha Boomi (feat. K.Suthakaran, Sinmaye Sivakumar, Balaji Sri & Georginaa Mathew)
Enndhan
Kadhavai Sathadi
Somewhere I Lost You

References

External links

Living people
Tamil playback singers
Tamil film score composers
Tamil musicians
Indian male singers
Musicians from Chennai
Indian Tamil people
Indian male playback singers
Indian male musicians
Indian male film score composers
Pianist from India
Year of birth missing (living people)